Qazi Jub (also Romanized as Qāẕī Jūb, and Qāzī Jūb; also known as Qāziju) is a village in Howmeh-ye Dehgolan Rural District, in the Central District of Dehgolan County, Kurdistan Province, Iran. At the 2006 census, its population was 298, in 72 families. The village is populated by Kurds.

References 

Towns and villages in Dehgolan County
Kurdish settlements in Kurdistan Province